Tomás Costa Silva (born 15 October 1999) is a Portuguese professional footballer who plays as a right winger for F.C. Vizela.

Club career

Sporting CP
Born in Viana do Castelo, Silva joined Sporting CP's academy at the age of 8. He made his senior debut with their under-23 and reserve sides.

Silva played his first Primeira Liga match with the main squad on the last day of the 2020–21 season, a 5–1 home win against C.S. Marítimo on 19 May; his appearance came as a reward for his hard work in training, and earned him a champions medal in the process.

Vizela
On 18 June 2021, Silva signed a three-year contract with F.C. Vizela, recently promoted to the top division. He made his debut in the competition for the club on 6 August, as a second-half substitute for Alex Mendez in the 3–0 away loss to former team Sporting.

Silva was loaned to Varzim S.C. of the Liga Portugal 2 on 26 January 2022, until 30 June. Subsequently returned to the Estádio do FC Vizela, on 12 September 2022 he was sent off for two yellow cards in a 0–1 home defeat to G.D. Estoril Praia, the second for diving in the box.

International career
Silva won one cap for Portugal at under-20 level, when he featured 23 minutes of the 3–0 friendly victory over Cape Verde on 30 January 2019.

Honours
Sporting CP
Primeira Liga: 2020–21

References

External links

1999 births
Living people
People from Viana do Castelo
Sportspeople from Viana do Castelo District
Portuguese footballers
Association football wingers
Primeira Liga players
Liga Portugal 2 players
Campeonato de Portugal (league) players
Sporting CP B players
Sporting CP footballers
F.C. Vizela players
Varzim S.C. players
Portugal youth international footballers